Pattinam is a panchayat town in Namakkal district in the Indian state of Tamil Nadu.

Demographics
 India census, Pattinam had a population of 8187. Males constitute 51% of the population and females 49%. Pattinam has an average literacy rate of 58%, lower than the national average of 59.5%: male literacy is 67%, and female literacy is 50%. In Pattinam, 10% of the population is under 6 years of age.

References

Cities and towns in Namakkal district